Jadwiga Tarło-Mniszech (b. between 1560 and 1570 – 1629) was a Polish noblewoman in the Polish–Lithuanian Commonwealth. Coat of arms – Topór. Married Jerzy Mniszech (died 1613) who was Krajczy koronny in 1574, castellan of Radom in 1583, Voivode of Sandomierz in 1590, żupnik of Ruthenia, starost of Lwów in 1593, starost of Sambor, Sokal, Sanok and Rohatyn.

Children
 Marina Mniszech (c. 1588–1614)
 Urszula Mniszech (b. 1603)
 Eufrozyna Mniszech
 Anna Mniszech
 Stanisław Bonifacy Mniszech (d. 1644)
 Stefan Jan Mniszech
 Franciszek Bernard Mniszech
 Mikołaj Mniszech (1587 -1613) – starosta łukowski
 Zygmunt Mniszech

Bibliography

 Andrzej Andrusiewicz, Dzieje Dymitriad 1602 – 1614, t. I, II, Warszawa 1990.
 Andrzej Andrusiewicz, Dzieje Wielkiej Smuty, Katowice 1999.
 Wojciech Polak, O Kreml i Smoleńszczyznę. Polityka Rzeczypospolitej wobec Moskwy w latach 1607–1612 Toruń 1995.
 Henryk Wisner, Król i car. Rzeczpospolita i Moskwa w XVI i XVII w., Warszawa 1995 
 Andrzej Grzegorz Przepiórka, Od Staroduba do Moskwy. Działania wojsk Dymitra II Samozwańca w latach 1607–1608. Zabrze 2007.
 Stanisław Żółkiewski, Początek i progres wojny moskiewskiej, opr. J. Maciszewski, Warszawa 1966.
 Zbigniew Wójcik, Historia powszechna XVI-XVII wieku, Warszawa 1968, s. 310.
 Diariusz drogi spisanej i różnych przypadków pociesznych i żałosnych prowadząc córkę Jerzego Mniszka, Marynę, Dymitrowi Iwanowiczowi w roku 1606; Stanisław Niemojewski; Warszawa; 2006.

16th-century births
Jadwiga
Mniszech family
Year of birth missing
Year of death missing